Hotel MyContinental Sibiu, formerly known as Hotel Ibis Sibiu Centre, and before that Hotel Continental, is a hotel building located in Sibiu. It has 13 floors and a surface of 16,000 m2.

External links

Hotel buildings completed in 1985
Buildings and structures in Sibiu
Hotels established in 1985
Skyscraper hotels in Romania
Hotels in Romania
1985 establishments in Romania